Kathy L. Chism (born August 22, 1957) is an American politician who has served in the Mississippi State Senate from the 3rd district since 2020.

Early life and education 
Born in Aurora, Illinois, Chism moved to Mississippi and attended Myrtle High School in Union County. After graduating, she attended Northeast Community College and Itawamba Community College.

Career 
Chism has worked in several occupations, including as a realtor, auctioneer, and business owner. In 2019, she ran for a Mississippi State Senator for the 3rd district, which includes portions of Benton, Ponotoc, and Union counties. She got 50.8% percent of the vote in the Republican primary runoff and 75.3% in the general election; she assumed office on January 7, 2020.

For the 2021 session, she is the Vice-Chair for the State Library Committee and is a member on the following committees: Appropriations; Business and Financial Institutions; Constitution; Drug Policy; Economic and Workforce Development; Labor; Public Property; and Wildlife, Fisheries, and Parks.

Political positions 
Chism has advocated for improvements regarding Mississippi's public education system. Prior to taking her seat, she called for a salary increase for public educators, a statewide public pre-K, and more opportunities for career and technical programs.

She was against changing the Mississippi state flag. In July 2020, she falsely claimed that the Mississippi Flag was designed by an African American Confederate Soldier, which was later proved wrong by the Mississippi Historical Society. Chism was one of 14 senators to vote against the bill to change the Mississippi flag, arguing the people of Mississippi should be allowed to vote on the decision.

Personal life 
Chism is a member of Union County Women, National Realtors Association, N. E. Board of Realtors, Republican Party Mississippi, and Mississippi Auctioneer. She is married and has one child and four grandchildren. She is a Baptist.

References

External links 
 Sponsored and Cosponsored Bills

1957 births
Living people
Republican Party Mississippi state senators
21st-century American politicians
Female auctioneers
People from Aurora, Illinois
21st-century American women politicians